Mediaset Italia is a Canadian Italian language specialty channel owned by TLN Media Group. It broadcasts programming from Canale 5, a television channel from Italy and local Canadian content.

Mediaset Italia Canada was licensed by the CRTC on September 6, 2006 as Italian Entertainment TV.

Mediaset Italia is the international service of Mediaset, the largest private broadcaster in Italy, founded in the 1970s by former Italian prime minister Silvio Berlusconi and still controlled today with a 38.6% stake by his family holding company Fininvest (via MFE - MediaForEurope), it features programming from Mediaset's three channels: Canale 5, Italia 1 and Rete 4.

Mediaset Italia airs top rated entertainment programming including comedies, dramas, reality shows as well as news and current affairs programs.

On April 2, 2014, Mediaset Italia launched on Bell Satellite TV and Bell Fibe TV.  On May 31, 2016, Mediaset Italia launched on Cogeco.

See also
 TLN
 Mediaset Italia

References

External links
 
 Mediaset Italia 

Mediaset television channels
Multicultural and ethnic television in Canada
Television channels and stations established in 2010
Italian-Canadian culture
Italian-language television stations
Digital cable television networks in Canada